Bahrain competed at the 1996 Summer Olympics in Atlanta, United States.

Athletics
Men's 110 metres hurdles
Fawaz Ismail Johar (56th place)

Sailing
Laser
Mohamed Al-Sada (51st place)

Soling
Essa al-Busmait (22nd place)
Khaled Al-Sada
Ahmed al-Sale

References

Official Olympic Reports

Nations at the 1996 Summer Olympics
1996
Summer Olympics